La Ballade de Calamity Jane  (The Ballad of Calamity Jane) is an album by Alain Bashung, his wife Chloé Mons and Rodolphe Burger, issued in October 2006 on Naïve Records.

Track listing 

2006 albums
Naïve Records albums
Alain Bashung albums